Nana Nafiou Badarou (born 18 July 1991) is a Beninese footballer who plays as a defender.

Burgan SC 
.

Career statistics

International

Statistics accurate as of match played 23 March 2016

References

1991 births
Living people
People from Porto-Novo
People from Cotonou
Beninese footballers
Association football defenders
Association football midfielders
Union Douala players
ASPAC FC players
Mbabane Swallows players
ASO Chlef players
Wydad AC players
MC Oujda players
Burgan SC players
Elite One players
Benin Premier League players
Algerian Ligue Professionnelle 1 players
Botola players
Kuwait Premier League players
Benin international footballers
Beninese expatriate footballers
Beninese expatriate sportspeople in Cameroon
Beninese expatriate sportspeople in Eswatini
Beninese expatriate sportspeople in Algeria
Beninese expatriate sportspeople in Morocco
Beninese expatriate sportspeople in Kuwait
Expatriate footballers in Cameroon
Expatriate footballers in Eswatini
Expatriate footballers in Algeria
Expatriate footballers in Morocco
Expatriate footballers in Kuwait
Beninese expatriate sportspeople in Togo
Expatriate footballers in Togo
Gomido FC players